The Wigan Branch Railway was an early British railway company operating in Lancashire. It was constructed to link the Wigan coalfield to the Liverpool and Manchester Railway (L&MR).

Background
The Wigan Branch Railway obtained an Act of Parliament on 29 May 1830 to build a  branch line from the Liverpool and Manchester Railway L&MR at Parkside to Wigan. The Act included another  branch off the Wigan line (the Springs branch) to collieries in the district.

The Act stipulated that the railway must be built by L&MR engineers and in June 1830 Charles Vignoles was appointed engineer at a salary of £500 (equivalent to £ in ). He was familiar with the area having been involved with the L&MR.

The line was promoted by a number of Wigan coal proprietors, one of whom, Ralph Thickness was the first chairman. The  railway from Parkside on the L&MR ran to Chapel Lane in Wigan. The Parkside station was inconvenient for Wigan Branch passengers as it was on the Liverpool side of the junction and the branch tracks ran onto the L&MR in the Manchester direction (that is only east curve into the L&MR was constructed).

The line was constructed by contractors Pritchard & Hoof who were awarded a two year maintenance contract. The Springs branch was not constructed at this time due to a lack of funds.

Operations
The line opened to traffic on 3 September 1832. The intention had been to construct a double track railway but money was in short supply and the line was constructed as a single track with three passing loops per mile, provision was made for a later doubling of the track.

The railway opened with two stations. 
Parkside station was opened by the L&MR on 15 September 1830.
Wigan Chapel Lane station was the only station opened by the WBR, it opened on 3 September 1832  and closed on 31 October 1838 when it was replaced by Wigan station opened by the North Union Railway further north when its line opened. Wigan station was renamed Wigan North Western railway station on 2 June 1924.

In what was a unique arrangement, the Wigan Branch Railway did not to hire its own staff or provide motive power and rolling stock. Instead the line was worked by the L&MR.  Parkside station was the terminus of the Wigan Branch Railway with passengers changing onto L&MR trains to get to Liverpool or Manchester.

Some colliery owners ran their own goods trains, Thomas Legh transported coal and coke from his Haydock Collieries to Edge Hill, Liverpool and to Liverpool Road, Manchester provided he used his own locomotives and wagons because he had an arrangement with the L&MR to use their railway.

The railway announced in October 1832 that it would begin moving goods along the line and constructed a warehouse at Wigan for this purpose.

In 1834 the railway decided to offer John Hargreaves, an established carrier in the north west, the lease for carrying freight. Hargreaves, in partnership with his son (also John Hargreaves) declined and made a counter offer which was accepted by the North Union Railway who by then had taken over the railway.

By 1838, the branch line had been doubled to facilitate an onward extension from Wigan to Preston.

Merger
The construction of the Preston and Wigan Railway was authorised in 1831 but construction was delayed. The directors of the Wigan Branch Railway and Preston and Wigan Railway decided to merge and an Act of Parliament gained royal assent on 22 May 1834 incorporating the two merged railways as the North Union Railway.

Later years in date order
In October 1838 a new station opened at Parkside on the Manchester side of the junction which improved the interchange between the railways. The station was jointly constructed by the L&MR, the North Union Railway and the Grand Junction Railway. The former station became a goods station. Parkside junction acquired a west curve in 1847 facilitating the running of through trains.

The Springs branch to the New Springs area of Wigan was opened by the North Union Railway in 1838.

The North Union Railway opened Golborne station  in about 1839, it was renamed Golborne South on 1 February 1949 and closed on 6 February 1961.

In 1847 the L&NWR opened a west curve onto the L&MR and a station was opened at the juncture of the two curves in 1849. In its early days it was sometimes known as North Union Junction, sometimes as Preston Junction before being renamed to Lowton & Preston Junction on 1 February 1877 and finally  in 1880, the station closed on 26 September 1949.

 station was opened on 1 April 1878 by the L&NWR and closed on 27 November 1950.

There also was a temporary station opened by the L&NWR to serve Haydock Racecourse near to the end of the century, but this was closed as early as 1902.

Notes

Citations

Bibliography

Further reading

External links

Early British railway companies
Historic transport in Lancashire
Rail transport in Lancashire
History of the Metropolitan Borough of Wigan
Railway companies established in 1830
Railway lines opened in 1832
1830 establishments in the United Kingdom
British companies established in 1830